Klappar och slag (Pats and Punches) is the second solo album of the Swedish singer Oskar Linnros, following Vilja bli (Wanting to Become). The album was released on May 29, 2013 in Sweden. The first single "Hur dom än" was released on February 20, 2013. The same day, he performed the song live on the Swedish equivalent to the Grammy Awards, Grammisgalan.

The album is mostly characterised by more songs being played in minor compared to his previous ones. The songs "Gå hem" and "Tunga moln" were predicted to become hits of the summer, just like "Från och med du" and "Genom eld" from his debut album Vilja bli. Even though there is a consensus among critics that it is a well polished album, many reviews mention a lack of playfulness and clarity.

Track listing

Charts

References

2013 albums
Oskar Linnros albums